The 1982 Embassy World Darts Championship was the fifth year that the British Darts Organisation had staged a world championship. For the fourth successive year, the tournament was staged at Jollees Cabaret Club in Stoke-on-Trent.

The event saw Scotland's first World Darts Champion, when Jocky Wilson defeated John Lowe in the final. Wilson was making his first final appearance while Lowe was contesting in his fourth final in five years.  Wilson would win the match 5-3 and claim the £6,500 first prize.

The tournament's reigning champion Eric Bristow suffered a shock first round exit to Northern Ireland's Steve Brennan, who then defeated Dave Whitcombe to reach the quarter-finals, losing to Stefan Lord.

Seeds
  Eric Bristow
  John Lowe
  Cliff Lazarenko
  Jocky Wilson
  Tony Brown
  Bobby George
  Leighton Rees
  Stefan Lord

Prize money
The prize fund was £27,400.

Champion: £6,500
Runner-Up: £3,000
3rd Place: £500
Semi-Finalists (2): £1,500
Quarter-Finalists (4): £1,000
Last 16 (8): £600
Last 32 (16): £350

There was also a 9 Dart Checkout prize of £52,000, along with a High Checkout prize of £600.

The results

Last 32

Third-place match
  Stefan Lord 76.65 2–1  Bobby George 76.68

References

BDO World Darts Championships
BDO World Darts 1982
Bdo World Darts Championship, 1982
Bdo World Darts Championship, 1982